Decebal may refer to:
 Decebalus, 1st-century king of Dacia
 Decebal, a village in Tătărăuca Veche, Moldova 
 Decebal, a village in Vetiș, Romania
 Decebal (name), a Romanian given name

See also 
 
 Decibel (disambiguation)